Clécio Nascimento Santos (31 May 1988 in Januária) commonly known as Clécio, is a Brazilian footballer.

Career
In April 2010, Clécio joined AIK Fotboll on a loan. After three matches in the spring, he was sent back.

References

1988 births
Sportspeople from Minas Gerais
Brazilian footballers
Brazilian expatriate footballers
Expatriate footballers in Sweden
Expatriate footballers in Portugal
Allsvenskan players
Campeonato Brasileiro Série B players
Campeonato Brasileiro Série D players
Brasiliense Futebol Clube players
Brasília Futebol Clube players
AIK Fotboll players
S.C. Olhanense players
Trindade Atlético Clube players
Sobradinho Esporte Clube players
Clube Esportivo Aimoré players
Ceilândia Esporte Clube players
Luverdense Esporte Clube players
Living people
Association football forwards